Dusart is a surname. Notable people with the surname include:

 Pierre Dusart, French mathematician
 Cornelis Dusart (1660–1704), Dutch painter, draftsman, and printmaker
 Jean Baptiste Dusart (Dieussart) (born  1630), Dutch sculptor